The Minister of Justice in Iceland is the head of the Ministry of Justice and is a member of the Cabinet of Iceland. The Ministry was formed in 2017 and as of 1 February 2022, the Minister is Jón Gunnarsson.

History 
The Minister of Justice and Ecclesiastical Affairs was the head of the Ministry of Justice and Ecclesiastical Affairs, which existed between 1 January 1970 and 1 October 2009. Before the Cabinet of Iceland Act no. 73/1969 took effect, ministries in Iceland had not existed separately from the ministers. Between 4 January 1917 and 1 January 1970, the minister responsible for justice was titled Minister of Justice and the minister responsible for ecclesiastical affairs was titled Minister of Ecclesiastical Affairs. In cases where one person was responsible for both, he or she was titled Minister of Justice and Ecclesiastical Affairs. On 1 October 2009, the position became Minister of Justice and Human Rights and the ministry itself was renamed accordingly. On 31 December 2010, the Ministry of Justice and Human Rights was merged with the Ministry of Transport, Communications and Local Government to form the Ministry of the Interior. On 1 May 2017 the Ministry of the Interior was again split up into the Ministry of Justice and the Ministry of Transport and Local Government.

List of ministers

Minister of Justice (4 January 1917 – 1 January 1970)

Minister of Ecclesiastical Affairs (4 January 1917 – 1 January 1970)

Minister of Justice and Ecclesiastical Affairs (1 January 1970 – 1 October 2009)

Minister of Justice and Human Rights (1 October 2009 – 31 December 2010)

Minister of the Interior (2011–2017) 

 See Minister of the Interior (Iceland)

Minister of Justice (2017–)

References